Consolidated Yachts is a former shipbuilder and  present-day marine service company located on City Island in The Bronx, New York City.

History 
The company was founded as the Gas Engine and Power Company & Charles L. Seabury Company in 1896 after the merger of the Charles L. Seabury Company (founded in 1885 in Nyack, New York) and the Gas Engine & Power Company (founded about the same time in Morris Heights, Bronx). Seabury was famous for its steam yachts; the Gas Engine & Power Company's primary focus was on naptha-powered launches.  Among other products, the combined company manufactured express cruisers, runabouts, yacht tenders, gas engines and alcohol ranges under the Speedway brand.  The manufacturing facility in Morris Heights was referred to as the Speedway Shipyard, and it stood along Mathewson Road, near what is today the location of Roberto Clemente State Park.  On July 16, 1908 Charles L. Seabury & Co's shipyard launched the "largest yacht in the world driven by motor power ... in the presence of its owner Charles Henry Fletcher".  She was 111 feet over all, with a 21-foot beam, and 260 horse power and an engineering feat for luxury yachts of the time.

After the First World War the company rebranded itself as Consolidated Shipbuilding.  It was heavily involved in the production of small yachts and military vessels, employing as many as 3,000 skilled tradespeople to that end.  Upon the conclusion of World War II, the company moved from Morris Heights to the former Robert Jacobs shipyard on City Island, and it continued to build ships until 1958.

World War II shipbuilding

 tugboats
 YT-364 ... YT-367, YT-388 ... YT-393, YT-520, YT-532 ... YT-545
 DPC-81 ... DPC-92, ST-752 ... ST-757, ST-769, ST-771
 51 of 343 s
  ...
  ... ,  ... 
  ...
  ...

References

Defunct shipbuilding companies of the United States
Defunct manufacturing companies based in New York City
Companies based in the Bronx
Manufacturing companies established in 1908
Manufacturing companies disestablished in 1958
1908 establishments in New York City
1958 disestablishments in New York (state)
Defunct companies based in New York City
Morris Heights, Bronx
City Island, Bronx
Harlem River
American companies established in 1908
American companies disestablished in 1958
Yachting in New York City